Ecaterina Guică (born 9 October 1993, in Bucharest, Romania) is a Canadian judoka who competes in the women's 52 kg category. She has been ranked in the top 10 of the world in her weight category.

Career
In 2010, Guica competed at the inaugural Summer Youth Olympics in Singapore.

In June 2016, she was named to Canada's Olympic team.

In June 2021, Guica was named to Canada's 2020 Olympic team.

See also
 Judo in Quebec
 Judo in Canada
 List of Canadian judoka

References

External links
 
 
 
 Ecaterina Guica at JudoCanada.org

Canadian female judoka
1993 births
Living people
Judoka at the 2015 Pan American Games
Pan American Games silver medalists for Canada
Judoka at the 2010 Summer Youth Olympics
Romanian emigrants to Canada
Naturalized citizens of Canada
Sportspeople from Bucharest
Judoka at the 2016 Summer Olympics
Olympic judoka of Canada
Pan American Games medalists in judo
Medalists at the 2015 Pan American Games
Judoka at the 2020 Summer Olympics